The 16th and 25th Consolidated Louisiana Infantry Regiment was a unit of volunteers recruited in Louisiana that fought in the Confederate States Army during the American Civil War. It served only in the Western Theater. The unit was created in November 1862 by combining the veteran 16th Louisiana and 25th Louisiana Infantry Regiments to form the consolidated regiment. The new unit served at Stones River, Jackson, Chickamauga, and Missionary Ridge in 1863. The unit fought at Resaca, New Hope Church, Atlanta, Ezra Church, Jonesborough, and Nashville in 1864. The consolidation was dissolved in February 1865 and the 16th and 25th Infantry Regiments were re-consolidated with other units

See also
List of Louisiana Confederate Civil War units
Louisiana in the Civil War

Notes

References

 

 

 

Units and formations of the Confederate States Army from Louisiana
1862 establishments in Louisiana
Military units and formations established in 1862
1865 disestablishments in Louisiana
Military units and formations disestablished in 1865